Gore Bay may refer to:

 Gore Bay, New Zealand
 Gore Bay, Ontario
 Gore Bay, New South Wales – and inlet on the northern foreshore of Sydney Harbour